Eudiaphora is a monotypic genus of tiger moths in the family Erebidae erected by Vladimir Viktorovitch Dubatolov in 1990. Its only species, Eudiaphora turensis, was first described by Nikolay Grigoryevich Erschoff in 1874. It is found in the mountains and deserts of Turkmenistan, Kazakhstan, Kyrgyzstan, Uzbekistan, Tajikistan, Afghanistan, western Mongolia, and China (Xinjiang).

Species and subspecies
Eudiaphora turensis (Erschoff, 1874)
Eudiaphora turensis kopetdaghica Dubatolov, 2004
Eudiaphora turensis kuhitangica Dubatolov, 2004

References

, 2004: Review of the genus Eudiaphora Dubat. (Lepidoptera, Arctiidae) with description of two new subspecies from Turkmenistan. Euroasian Entomological Journal 3 (2): 151–154, colour plate II, KMK Press: Novosibirsk-Moscow (in Russian).

Spilosomina
Monotypic moth genera
Moths of Asia